Parliamentary elections were held in Cape Verde in June 1975 in preparation for independence from Portugal on 5 July. The African Party for the Independence of Guinea and Cape Verde was the sole legal party at the time, with voters being asked to approve or reject a PAIGC list of 56 members for the National People's Assembly. Its party leader was Aristides Pereira. The list was approved by 95.6% of voters, with a turnout of 86.7%.

Results

References

Cape Verde
1975
Parliamentary election
One-party elections
Single-candidate elections
Cape Verdean parliamentary election
Election and referendum articles with incomplete results